Santo Domingo Cathedral may refer to:
Basilica Cathedral of Santa María la Menor, Santo Domingo, Dominican Republic
Episcopal Cathedral of the Epiphany-Union Church of Santo Domingo, Dominican Republic
Cathedral of the Roman Catholic Diocese of Santo Domingo in Ecuador
Cobán Cathedral (Catedral de Santo Domingo de Guzmán), Guatemala
Basco Cathedral, Philippines, also known as Santo Domingo
Bayombong Cathedral (Santo Domingo de Guzman Cathedral), Nueva Vizcaya, Philippines
Santo Domingo de la Calzada Cathedral, Spain